Gerd Schmückle (1 December 1917 – 28 May 2013) was a German four-star general. Schmückle served in the 7th Panzer Division under Erwin Rommel during the Fall of France. With this division he later fought in the Soviet Union where he was wounded six times. In early 1944, he was promoted to the German General Staff, major and artillery battalion commander. After the surrender of the Wehrmacht in 1945 he operated a farm in Bavaria and worked as a journalist. In 1956, he joined the Bundeswehr where he was promoted to general in 1978.

From 1978 to 1980 he was Deputy Supreme Allied Commander Europe, the first German to hold the post.

Journalistic works 
 Kommiß a. D. Kritische Gänge durch die Kasernen. Seewald, Stuttgart 1971 (2., überarbeitete Auflage. ebenda 1972).
 Ohne Pauken und Trompeten. Erinnerungen an Krieg und Frieden. Deutsche Verlags-Anstalt, Stuttgart 1982, .
 Das Schwert am seidenen Faden. Krisenmanagement in Europa. Deutsche Verlags-Anstalt, Stuttgart 1984, .

References 

1917 births
2013 deaths
German Army officers of World War II
Bundeswehr generals
Politicians from Stuttgart
People from the Kingdom of Württemberg
NATO military personnel
Generals of the German Army
Grand Crosses with Star and Sash of the Order of Merit of the Federal Republic of Germany
Military personnel from Stuttgart